Darrell Lee Einertson (born September 4, 1972) is a former Major League Baseball player. Einertson played for the New York Yankees in the  season. In eleven career games, he had a 0-0 record with a 3.55 ERA. He also had three strikeouts.

He was drafted by the Yankees in the 11th round of the 1995 amateur draft.

External links
Baseball-Reference

New York Yankees players
1972 births
Iowa Wesleyan Tigers baseball players
Cameron Aggies baseball players
People from Rhinelander, Wisconsin
Baseball players from Wisconsin
Living people
Columbus Clippers players
Gulf Coast Yankees players
Greensboro Bats players
Norwich Navigators players
Oneonta Yankees players
Tampa Yankees players
Indian Hills Falcons baseball players